Leliko is a Turkish 3D animation television series created by Ayşe Şule Bilgiç, who also created Pepee. It is produced by Düşyeri Cartoon Film Studio (Düşyeri Çizgi Film Stüdyosu). The series premiered on the children's television channel Planet Çocuk (:tr) on 7 October 2013.

Characters

Leli (voiced by Ece Sefertaş)
Liko (voiced by Başar Şahinyılmaz)
Kulabuz  (voiced by Yağız Alp Şimşek)

Production
The series features songs and musical numbers produced by Kıraç and Nevzat Yılmaz.

References

External links

Turkish animated television series
2013 Turkish television series debuts
2010s animated television series
Current Turkish television series
Television shows set in Istanbul
Television series produced in Istanbul